Ernstus "Ernie" Wilhelmus Johannes Brandts (born 3 February 1956) is a Dutch football manager and former player.

Playing career

Club
Born in Didam, he played for local club De Sprinkhanen before joining De Graafschap at 17. After three seasons he moved on to PSV with whom he won two Eredivisie league titles in 7 seasons. He later played for Roda JC, MVV and Belgian side Germinal Ekeren before returning to his first professional club De Graafschap.

International
Brandts earned 28 caps and scored five goals for the Netherlands national football team and played in the 1978 FIFA World Cup. In a second-round match against Italy, he became the first player to score goals for both teams in the same match in the World Cup. He scored an own goal in the 18th minute, and then scored the equalizer for the Netherlands in the 50th minute. His teammate Arie Haan eventually scored the winning goal, giving the Netherlands a 2–1 win.

Coaching career
Brandts began as an assistant manager at PSV, and has managed FC Volendam and NAC Breda as well as clubs in Iran and Africa.

Halfway through the 2007–08 season, Brandts was informed that his contract as head trainer of NAC would not be extended, despite the best results (3rd position in 2007–08 Eredivisie) NAC Breda had seen for a long time. This decision was not taken lightly by the NAC Breda supporters - despite all the complaints the NAC top directors went ahead with their plan. Brandts was replaced by Robert Maaskant at the beginning of the 2008–2009 season.

He was appointed as the coach of Iranian side Rah Ahan in summer of 2009
and he was appointed coach of Rwandan army club APR in 2010 and achieved the double. In 2012-2013 he was coach of Young Africans and won all the cups. On 25 December 2013, he left the club with a mutual consent agree by both parties.

He returned to the Netherlands and started as head coach of FC Dordrecht in June 2014, but after a decent start of their Eredivisie campaign Brandts decided with agreement of the club to stop in February 2015. Brandts was named assistant manager at N.E.C. in 2016.

References

External links

1956 births
Living people
People from Montferland
Footballers from Gelderland
Association football central defenders
Dutch footballers
Netherlands international footballers
1978 FIFA World Cup players
UEFA Euro 1980 players
De Graafschap players
PSV Eindhoven players
Roda JC Kerkrade players
MVV Maastricht players
Beerschot A.C. players
Eredivisie players
Belgian Pro League players
Dutch expatriate footballers
Expatriate footballers in Belgium
Dutch expatriate sportspeople in Belgium
Dutch football managers
FC Volendam managers
NAC Breda managers
APR F.C. managers
Young Africans S.C. managers
FC Dordrecht managers
FC Eindhoven managers
Eredivisie managers
Dutch expatriate football managers
Expatriate football managers in Iran
Expatriate football managers in Rwanda
Expatriate football managers in Tanzania
Dutch expatriate sportspeople in Iran
Dutch expatriate sportspeople in Rwanda
Dutch expatriate sportspeople in Tanzania
UEFA Cup winning players